Luis de Velasco y Velasco, 2nd Count of Salazar, 1st Marquess of Belvedere, (Valladolid, Spain, 1559 – Dunkirk, Spanish Netherlands (present-day France), 1625), was a Spanish military commander during the French Wars of Religion and the Eighty Years' War.

Life 
His parents were Juan de Velasco, señor de Castrillo de Tejeriego and Beatriz de Mendoza, daughter of Luis de Velasco, marqués de Salinas.
He married Anne de Hénin, daughter of Jacques de Hénin, Marquess of la Veere. He became the brother-in-law of Íñigo de Borja. They had two children:

 Juan de Velasco, 2nd Marquess of Belveder;
 Anna de Velasco; married to Rasse de Gavre, 1st Marquess of Ayseau, she became grandmother of Charles I Emmanuel, 1st Prince de Gavre 

He is best remembered for his role in the Spanish conquest of Calais (1596), Steenbergen (1622) and the failed Siege of Bergen-op-Zoom (1622).

He became a Knight in the Order of the Golden Fleece in 1622.

He died from disease when he was in Dunkirk inspecting the defenses.

External links
Luis de Velasco y Velasco, 2nd Count of Salazar 

1559 births
1625 deaths
People from Valladolid
16th-century Spanish nobility
17th-century Spanish nobility
Counts of Spain
Knights of the Golden Fleece
Marquesses of Spain
Spanish generals
Spanish people of the Eighty Years' War